Alexander C. Berg is an American Assistant Professor of computer science at the University of North Carolina at Chapel Hill. He specializes in web mining as well as machine learning and computer vision.

He obtained his master's and bachelor's degrees from Johns Hopkins University in 1994 and then got his PhD at University of California, Berkeley in 2005 under Jitendra Malik. He stayed at Berkeley as a postdoc from 2006 to 2007, and in February 2007 he became both research scientist and visiting professor at the same place and then became Yahoo! Researcher at Yahoo! where he worked till May 2008. Currently he is at the University of North Carolina at Chapel Hill.

As a Yahoo! Researcher, Berg teamed up with Subhransu Maji and Jitendra Malik of University of California, Berkeley to develop kernelized SVMs.
In October 2011 he and colleagues developed two kinds of face recognition software called FaceTracer and PubFig.

Berg is married to fellow computer vision researcher Tamara Berg.

References

External links 
 

Living people
20th-century births
American computer scientists
Johns Hopkins University alumni
University of California, Berkeley alumni
University of North Carolina at Chapel Hill faculty
Stony Brook University faculty
Columbia University faculty
Year of birth missing (living people)